Água Rosada or Álvaro XIV was ruler in Kongo, Africa, from February 1891 to 1896. His father signed the vassalage of Kongo in 1888.

Family
Álvaro XIV was the son of Pedro VI, brother of Álvaro XIII and son of Henrique II. Henrique had split his lands between his two sons; Álvaro and Pedro. They did a swap and Pedro got Kongo on 7 August 1859. Then he signed a treaty in 1888 that Kongo would go to Portuguese rule. Then Pedro died in February 1891 and Álvaro XIV succeeded in the throne of Kongo. He was canonized in 1892 as Álvaro XIV, he died in 1896 and he was succeeded by his son Pedro VI.

Manikongo of Kongo
1896 deaths
Year of birth unknown